My Sister of Eternal Flower (Traditional Chinese: 花花世界花家姐), is the title of a Hong Kong television drama starring Charmaine Sheh, Raymond Lam, Ngo Ka-nin, and Toby Leung. Produced by Kwan Wing Chung My Sister of Eternal Flower is a TVB production. It premiered on 16 May 2011.

Synopsis
The company XENUS was successfully run by Zhang Sum (Bowie Wu).  One day Zhang Sum ended up in the hospital, and his spoiled grandson Hugo (Raymond Lam) took over the company.  However, Hugo was incapable and loses control of the company to Mike (Ngo Ka-nin), a genuinely skilled manager.

Mike manipulated the company and moved all the clients to his own company.  XENUS was near collapse, while Hugo loses everything and becomes the joke of society.  At the lowest point of his life, the only one that backed him up was a mentally low-IQ girl Fa Lai-chu (Charmaine Sheh). Hugo would bounce back and have to decide between the intellectually disabled girl Fa and Agnes (Yoyo Chen), the beautiful perfect model who didn't stand by him enough.

Cast

Fa's family

Chiang's family

Luk's family

Ha's family

XENUS Boutique

Other cast

Awards and nominations

45th TVB Anniversary Awards 2011
 Nominated: Best Drama
 Nominated: Best Actress (Charmaine Sheh)
 Nominated: Most Improved Male Artiste (Jazz Lam)
 Nominated: Most Improved Male Artiste (Matt Yeung)

Viewership ratings

Analysis
The show did generate a lot of online comments.  Some people felt that a screenplay having a mentally ill character was a disrespect to the mentally disabled community.  Others felt that the role played by Charmaine Sheh is largely a copy of Roger Kwok's role of a mentally disabled person (previously in Square Pegs).

References

External links

TVB.com My Sister of Eternal Flower - Official Website 
K for TVB English Synopsis 

TVB dramas
2011 Hong Kong television series debuts
2011 Hong Kong television series endings